The 2014–15 Pro50 Championship was the thirteenth edition of the Pro50 Championship, a List A cricket tournament in Zimbabwe. The competition began on 9 November 2014 and the final was played on 21 March 2015. After the 2013-14 season, Southern Rocks had their franchise suspended, leaving only four teams to compete.

Mashonaland Eagles won the tournament for the third time, having finished in second place in the round-robin, but defeated the Matabeleland Tuskers in the final by 4 wickets.

Mountaineers batsman Roy Kaia was the tournament's leading run-scorer with a total of 382 runs. Matabeleland Tuskers bowler Christopher Mpofu was the leading wicket-tacker with a total of 19 wickets.

Points table

 Qualified for the final

Fixtures

Round-robin

Final

References

External links
 Series home at ESPN Cricinfo

2014 in Zimbabwean cricket
2015 in Zimbabwean cricket
Pro50 Championship
Pro50 Championship